The 1911 Loyola University Chicago football team represented Loyola University of Chicago during the 1911 college football season.

Schedule

Third team schedule

References

Loyola University Chicago
Loyola Ramblers football seasons
Loyola University Chicago football